Hacıbəbir (also, Gadzhi-Babir and Gadzhybabir) is a village and municipality in the Sabirabad Rayon of Azerbaijan.  It has a population of 379.

References 

Populated places in Sabirabad District